The 2016 Mid-Eastern Athletic Conference football season was the XXIst season for MEAC Football, as part of the 2016 NCAA Division I FCS football season.

Previous season

21st ranked North Carolina A&T, along with #25 Bethune-Cookman and non-ranked North Carolina Central were named MEAC Co-Champions. Due to the MEAC's tiebreaker system, North Carolina A&T earned the conference's invitation to the inaugural Celebration Bowl. The Aggies defeated Southwestern Athletic Conference Champion, Alcorn State 41-34 and earning their fourth HBCU national championship.

Head coaches
Terry Sims, Bethune-Cookman – 2nd year
Kenneth Carter, Delaware State– 2nd year
Alex Wood, Florida A&M – 2nd year
Connell Maynor, Hampton – 3rd year
Gary Harrell, Howard – 5th year
Frederick Farrier, Morgan State – 2nd year
Latrell Scott, Norfolk State – 2nd year
Rod Broadway, North Carolina A&T – 6th year
Jerry Mack, North Carolina Central – 3rd year
Erik Raeburn, Savannah State – 1st year
Oliver Pough, South Carolina State – 15th year

Rankings

All times Eastern time.

Rankings reflect that of the STATS FCS poll for that week.

Week one

Players of the week:

Week two

Players of the week:

Postseason
Since 1996, the MEAC earned an automatic bid into the Football Championship Subdivision playoffs. As of the 2015 season, the conference champion will abstain from participating in the playoffs and compete against the Southwestern Athletic Conference (SWAC) in the newly created Celebration Bowl. Any other team from the MEAC is able to participate in the playoff if they earn an at-large bid.

Bowl games

FCS Playoffs

Records against other conferences

MEAC vs. FCS conferences

MEAC vs. FBS conferences

Attendance

Notes

References